Eragrostis eriopoda, the woollybutt grass, is a species of love grass in the family Poaceae, native to most of Australia. It is a major grass species of the mulga savanna. In the same genus as teff, its seeds are edible, but very small.

References

eriopoda
Endemic flora of Australia
Flora of Western Australia
Flora of the Northern Territory
Flora of Queensland
Flora of South Australia
Flora of New South Wales
Plants described in 1878